Gréasque is a commune northeast of Marseille in the department of Bouches-du-Rhône in the Provence-Alpes-Côte d'Azur region in southern France. It was traditionally a mining town.

Population

The inhabitants are called Gréasquéens.

See also
Communes of the Bouches-du-Rhône department

References

External links

  Official town website

Communes of Bouches-du-Rhône
Bouches-du-Rhône communes articles needing translation from French Wikipedia